Poul Krebs (born 28 May 1956 in Aarhus, Denmark) is a Danish pop/rock singer, songwriter and musician. He has released 23 albums and compilations, several topping the Danish Albums Chart.

Krebs grew up in Aarhus and was in his youth a talented handball player with IK Skovbakken main team. From his childhood, he was also involved in music forming his own band singing various covers. His main studio album, Fri som et forår (1990) was produced by the experienced English producer Greg Walsh. He moved with his girlfriend and future wife Ulla to Amsterdam where she was a choreographer. He composed the lyrics and music for the album Små Sentationer with one of his biggest hits "Sådan nogle som os" which was his real breakthrough in 1995.

Since the early 1990s, Poul Krebs has played on concert stages and released a great number of albums. He also collaborated with  recording studios. He has tried his hand in several different contexts and among others one of The Three Tenors along with Steffen Brandt and Michael Falch as De Tre Tenorer (the Three Tenors). Falch and Krebs, best friends, toured together and released joint albums establishing also their own record label Krebs Falch.

Krebs is well-known internationally through tours in Norway, Greenland, France and the United States and has collaborated with numerous musicians. He is also a regular charity concerts for, amongst others, Kosovo victims, Muscular Dystrophy Foundation, environmental/green causes and for the Danish Refugee Council. He is also a regular presence in biggest Danish music festivals, with songs in both English and Danish. In 2014, he was among the featured artists for season four of Toppen af Poppen on Danish TV 2 station.

Discography

Albums
Studio albums
1979: Efter stormen (Stuk)
1982: Krebs Band (Ferry) (credited as Krebs Band)
1984: Nat nu – under stjernerne (Front) (credited as Krebs Band)
1988: Hvor gaden bli'r til sand (Sundance)
1989: Langt fra en ordentlig by (Sonet)
1990: Fri som et forår (Sonet)
1991: Morgendagens tåber (Columbia) (credited to Poul Krebs & The Bookhouse Boys)
1992: Strejfer (Columbia) (credited as Poul Krebs & The Bookhouse Boys)
1993: Dansen, månen og vejen (CMC)
1995: Små sensationer (Pladecompagniet)
1997: Kosmorama (Pladecompagniet)
1999: Forbandede vidunderlige tøs (Pladecompagniet)

Live albums

Compilation albums

References

External links
Official website

Danish male singers
Danish songwriters
1956 births
Living people
People from Aarhus